Roadsters (working title: Roadsters Trophy) is a racing game released by Titus Software for Nintendo 64 in 1999, and for PlayStation, Dreamcast and Game Boy Color in 2000. It is a car racing game that features both licensed cars from manufacturers (e.g. Mitsubishi, Alfa Romeo, Lotus) and unlicensed cars from imaginary manufacturers that are based on and bear great resemblance to their equivalent, real car models. The game also includes a multi-player mode supports up to 2 human players that can compete in any of the available circuits with 4 more CPU controlled racers. A PlayStation 2 version was originally planned to release on April 11, 2001.

Gameplay
Roadsters is a car racing game that features both licensed cars from manufacturers (e.g. Mitsubishi, Alfa Romeo, Lotus) and unlicensed cars from imaginary manufacturers that are based on and bear great resemblance to their equivalent, real car models. The game has 8 racers and 34 cars from which players can choose from and 4 modes in total.

In the Roadster Trophy, the player starts by selecting one of the available racers and is given a sum of money that must be used to acquire a car. There are 3 divisions in which the player can compete on with the 3rd being of the easiest difficulty and requiring less money to participate; the 1st being the most difficult one and needing a higher amount of money in order to participate. More money can be earned by winning the races and that in turn allows to buy new cars or upgrade the ones that are already in possession. In Quick Race the player can select the racer, car, circuit and weather conditions, and race against 7 more CPU controlled players.

The game also includes a Multi-Player mode which supports up to 2 human players that can compete in any of the available circuits with 4 more CPU controlled racers. The mode allows for either vertical or horizontal split screen. Like Quick Race mode, the player can also select here the racer, car, circuit and weather conditions but without the competition of the other modes, the player races against time for as many laps as the player wants.

Reception

The Nintendo 64 and PlayStation versions received mixed reviews, while the Dreamcast and Game Boy Color versions received unfavorable reviews, according to the review aggregation website GameRankings. Michael Wolf of NextGen said of the N64 version in its April 2000 issue that the game is not adrenaline-pumping as San Francisco Rush, but called it a solid game with a decent engine that will satisfy racing fans until Nintendo's release of Ridge Racer 64. Three issues later, however, Greg Orlando gave a negative review for the Dreamcast version.

Notes

References

External links
 
 

1999 video games
Dreamcast games
Game Boy Color games
Nintendo 64 games
PlayStation (console) games
Racing video games
Titus Software games
Video games developed in France